Empirical distribution may refer to:

 Empirical distribution function
 Empirical measure